The Progressive Party (FSF) is an agrarian political party in Iceland.

For most of its history, the Progressive Party has governed with the Independence Party. Since 30 November 2017, the party has been a coalition partner in the Katrín Jakobsdóttir government. The current chairman of the party is Sigurður Ingi Jóhannsson who was elected on 2 October 2016. His predecessor was Sigmundur Davíð Gunnlaugsson, who was elected on 18 January 2009 and was Prime Minister of Iceland from 23 May 2013 to 5 April 2016.

History

The Progressive Party was founded to represent Iceland's farmer class, which went from being dominant from settlement to the late 19th century to rapidly dwindling in the early 20th century as a result of industrialization and urbanization. Its primary support still comes from the rural areas of Iceland and its policy roots still stem from its origin as an agrarian party, although it has since come to self-identify as a liberal party, though this is disputed outside of the party. It was founded in 1916 as a merger of two agrarian parties, the Farmers' Party (Bændaflokkur) and the Independent Farmers (Óháðir bændur). In 1956 the party almost agreed to an aborted merger with the Social Democratic Party.

Throughout Iceland's history as a self-governing and independent nation, the Progressive Party has most often been the second largest political party in the country. It has often joined government coalitions with either the Independence Party on the centre-right, or with centre-left parties. During the period 1927–1990, the Progressive Party held the prime minister post for thirty years and spent more than two-thirds of the time in coalition government.

1970s 
Following the 1971 parliamentary election, the Progressive Party formed a government with the People's Alliance and Union of Liberals and Leftists, with Progressive Party chairman Ólafur Jóhannesson serving as Prime Minister.

The 1974 parliamentary election led to a coalition government of the Independence Party and Progressive Party led by Geir Hallgrímsson.

The 1978 parliamentary election returned Ólafur Jóhannesson to the role of Prime Minister, leading a coalition containing the Progressive Party, People's Alliance and Social Democratic Party after two months of coalition negotiations.

The snap 1979 parliamentary election caused by the withdrawal of the Social Democrats from government led to a new government being formed in February 1980 by the Independence Party of Prime Minister Gunnar Thoroddsen, Progressive Party and People's Alliance.

1980s 
The 1983 parliamentary election resulted in Progressive Party leader Steingrímur Hermannsson becoming Prime Minister in coalition with the Independence Party.

The 1987 parliamentary election in May saw a coalition being formed in July of that year led by Thorsteinn Pálsson of the Independence Party, with the Progressive Party and Social Democratic Party as junior partners. However, in September 1988, a new government was formed by the Progressive Party's Steingrímur Hermannsson with the Social Democrats and People's Alliance.

1990s 
Following the 1991 parliamentary election, the Progressive Party was in opposition, with the government being formed by Independence Party leader Davíð Oddsson.

In the 1995 parliamentary election, Davíð Oddsson remained as Prime Minister, with the Progressive Party returning to government as junior coalition partner to the Independence Party, a coalition which continued after the 1999 election.

2000s 
In the 2003 parliamentary election, the Progressive Party received 17.2% of the vote and 12 seats in the Althing. On 15 September 2004, Halldór Ásgrímsson of the Progressive Party took over as Prime Minister from Davíð Oddsson. Halldór Ásgrímsson announced his intention to resign on 5 June 2006 following the party's poor results in the 2006 municipal elections. The coalition remained allied with the Independence Party chairman, Geir H. Haarde, as Prime Minister. The Progressive Party leader Jón Sigurðsson was Minister of Industry and Commerce, until a coalition of the Independence Party and the Social Democratic Alliance took over after the elections in 2007.

In the 2007 parliamentary election, the party dropped five seats to hold only seven seats, down from twelve. The coalition only held a one-seat majority in the Althing, and the Independence Party formed a coalition government with the Social Democratic Alliance with the deal being signed on 22 May, returning the Progressive Party to the opposition. When a centre-left minority government was formed in February 2009, in the wake of the 2008–2011 Icelandic financial crisis, the Progressive Party agreed to defend it from a no-confidence vote, but did not form part of the governing coalition.

In January 2009, it decided to change its party line on joining the European Union (EU) from being opposed to being in favour of EU accession, but with very strong caveats. The party later changed its policy to one of firm opposition to EU membership. In the wake of the 2008–2011 Icelandic financial crisis, the Progressive Party became more populist. According to political scientist Eiríkur Bergmann, "a completely renewed leadership took over the country’s old agrarian party, the Progressive Party (Framsóknarflokkurinn— PP), which was rapidly retuned in a more populist direction; geared against foreign creditors, international institutions and eventually partly towards anti- Muslim rhetoric, which until then had been absent in the country—there is no significant Muslim minority in Iceland. Under the new post-crisis leader- ship, the Progressive Party thus moved closer to populist parties in Europe."

In the 2009 parliamentary election, the Progressive Party fared somewhat better, securing 14.8% of the vote, and increasing its number of seats from seven to nine. It remained in opposition, however, with a centre-left coalition of the Social Democratic Alliance and the Left-Green Movement continuing to govern with an increased majority.

2010s 
In the 2013 parliamentary election, the Progressive Party reached second place nationally, winning 24.4% of the vote and 19 seats. Following the election, a centre-right coalition government was formed between the Progressive Party and Independence Party, Sigmundur Davíð Gunnlaugsson of the Progressive Party appointed as Prime Minister. Sigmundur Davíð was ousted as leader of the party shortly after he was implicated in scandal and ethical quandaries in the Panama Papers release.

The Progressive Party split in 2017 when Sigmundur Davíð created his own party, the Centre Party (Miðflokkurinn).

2020s 

After the 2021 parliamentary election, the new government was, just like the previous government, a tri-party coalition of the Independence Party, the Progressive Party and the Left-Green Movement, headed by Prime Minister Katrín Jakobsdóttir of Left-Green Movement.

Electoral results

Members of Parliament
Since the elections in 2021, the Progressive Party has thirteen members of parliament.

Leadership

See also 
 Independence Party (Iceland)
 Nordic agrarian parties
 Liberalism in Europe
 Liberalism worldwide
 List of liberal parties
 Liberalism and centrism in Iceland

References

External links 
 Progressive Party official site

 
1916 establishments in Iceland
Eurosceptic parties in Iceland
Liberal International
Liberal parties in Iceland
Nordic agrarian parties
Political parties established in 1916